Antonio Aguilar Rodríguez (born 4 May 1973) better known as Tony Aguilar is a Spanish radio DJ and television presenter.

Career

Radio 
In the early 1990s, Aguilar was the runner-up in a national disc jockey contest, and as a result he was hired for the local broadcast of Los 40 in Radio Barcelona.

In 1995, Aguilar debuted in nationwide radio with radio breakfast show Anda ya on Los 40, which he hosted until 1998. He also presents the hitlist show Del 40 al 1 since 1995. In 1998, Aguilar started to present 40 Principales Radio Show.

Since 2015, Aguilar hosts 40 Global Show, a music programme that airs in twelve (eleven before the creation of Los 40 Nicaragua in 2017) Spanish-speaking countries of the Los 40 radio network.

Television 
In television, Aguilar hosted the music shows Leña al mono que es de goma on Antena 3 in 1993, and Zona franca, alongside Arancha de Benito, on TVE in 1995. On 40 TV, he hosted Fórmula Weekend alongside Joaquín Luqui in 1999, as well as Los 40 Principales between 2000 and 2005, and the television version of the hitlist show Del 40 al 1 until the channel's closure in 2017. Aguilar then hosted Coca Cola Music Experience on Cuatro.

In 2014, Aguilar was an occasional panelist for the talk show ¡Qué tiempo tan feliz!, hosted by María Teresa Campos on Telecinco. In 2017, he was a panelist on the Spanish version of the talent show Fantastic Duo, on La 1. In 2017 and 2018, Aguilar was also an occasional panelist for the talk show Viva la vida, on Telecinco. In 2019, Aguilar was a judge on the La 1 music show La mejor canción jamás cantada, as well as a regular panelist on the La 1 talk show A partir de hoy.

In 2018, Aguilar provided the Spanish commentary for the Eurovision Song Contest 2018 alongside Julia Varela, a role he repeated in the 2019 Contest and the 2019 Junior Contest.

Awards 
In 2011, Aguilar was nominated for a National Radio Award for Best Music Presenter. In 2016, Aguilar won the Ondas Award for Best Music Programme for Del 40 al 1.

References

External links
 

1973 births
Living people
People from Cornellà de Llobregat
Spanish television presenters
Spanish radio personalities